The Phelps House (or Rose Hill Estate), is located in Aiken, South Carolina. The house was built in the early 1900s on the foundations of an antebellum house that had been destroyed during the Civil War. It is historically significant for several reasons, one of which is its very distinctive Shingle Style. This style, used often in the late 1800s and early 1900s in the resort homes of the rich, was rarely used in South Carolina. The large house has over 20 rooms, and the grounds include the stables, garage, greenhouses and kennels. As of 2012, the home is available for commercial purposes and due to this use, can be readily viewed and enjoyed. It was listed in the National Register of Historic Places on June 10, 1974.

Today, the property is open to the public with amenities that include Overnight Accommodations, Event Venue Facilities, Catering and The Stables Restaurant.

References

Houses on the National Register of Historic Places in South Carolina
Shingle Style architecture in South Carolina
Houses completed in 1900
Houses in Aiken County, South Carolina
National Register of Historic Places in Aiken County, South Carolina
Buildings and structures in Aiken, South Carolina